Den of Iniquity (German: Sündenbabel) is a 1925 German silent film directed by Constantin J. David and starring Reinhold Schünzel, Jack Trevor and Maly Delschaft.

The film's sets were designed by the art director Alfred Junge.

Cast
 Reinhold Schünzel as Emil Stiebel  
 Jack Trevor as Hellmuth Roeder  
 Maly Delschaft as Loni, seine Frau  
 Hans Brausewetter as Hans Lengefeld  
 Arnold Korff as John Benningsen  
 Barbara von Annenkoff as Madame Marion  
 Anna Müller-Lincke as Frau Tietze  
 Renate Brausewetter as Erna Tietze  
 Kurt Vespermann as Gustav  
 Frida Richard as Reinemachefrau  
 Eugen Rex 
 Gretl Schubert 
 Grete Kerstein

References

Bibliography
 Hans-Michael Bock and Tim Bergfelder. The Concise Cinegraph: An Encyclopedia of German Cinema. Berghahn Books, 2009.

External links

1925 films
Films of the Weimar Republic
Films directed by Constantin J. David
German silent feature films
German black-and-white films
Bavaria Film films